Stiracolpus is a genus of sea snails, marine gastropod mollusks in the family Turritellidae.

Species
Species within the genus Stiracolpus include:
 Stiracolpus ahiparanus (Powell, 1927)
 † Stiracolpus hurunuiensis (Marwick, 1957) 
 † Stiracolpus huttoni (Cossmann, 1912) 
 Stiracolpus kaawaensis Laws, 1936 
 Stiracolpus pagoda (Reeve, 1849)
 † Stiracolpus procellosus (Marwick, 1931) 
 † Stiracolpus propagoda (Laws, 1940) 
 † Stiracolpus quennelli (Marwick, 1957) 
 Stiracolpus symmetricus (Hutton, 1873)
 † Stiracolpus vigilax (Marwick, 1957) 
 † Stiracolpus wiltoni (Marwick, 1957) 
Species brought into synonymy
 Stiracolpus blacki (Marwick, 1957): synonym of Stiracolpus pagoda (Reeve, 1849)
 Stiracolpus kimberi (Verco, 1908): synonym of Turritellopsis kimberi (Verco, 1908)
  † Stiracolpus nanulus (Marwick, 1957): synonym of Stiracolpus symmetricus (Hutton, 1873)
  † Stiracolpus ohopeus (Marwick, 1957): synonym of Stiracolpus pagoda (Reeve, 1849)
 Stiracolpus robinae (Marwick, 1957): synonym of Stiracolpus symmetricus (Hutton, 1873)
 Stiracolpus shepherdi (Marwick, 1957): synonym of Stiracolpus symmetricus (Hutton, 1873)
 Stiracolpus smithiana (Donald, 1900): synonym of Colpospira smithiana (Donald, 1900)
 Stiracolpus uttleyi (Marwick, 1957): synonym of Stiracolpus pagoda (Reeve, 1849)
 Stiracolpus waikopiroensis (Suter, 1917): synonym of Stiracolpus pagoda (Reeve, 1849)

References

 

Turritellidae
Taxa named by Harold John Finlay